Goniodoris mimula is a species of sea slug, a dorid nudibranch, a marine gastropod mollusc in the family Goniodorididae.

Description
The body grows to a length of 10 mm.

Distribution
This marine species was first described from Brazil. It also occurs in the Caribbean Sea off Mexico.

References

Goniodorididae
Gastropods described in 1955